South Korean girl group 2NE1 has embarked on three headlining concert tours, one of which is a worldwide tour. Their first concert appearance was at the "YG Family Concert" held in December 2010 in Seoul. The group's first headlining tour was  "Nolza!"  and then "Nolza! in Japan", in support of their second Korean EP and their first Japanese EP, respectively, which reached over 70,000 people in Japan alone.

The group then embarked on their first worldwide concert tour, the "New Evolution World Tour". The tour's first stop was made in Seoul on July 28, 2012, and made its first international stop in the United States at the Prudential Center in Newark on August 17, which was followed by one more date at the Nokia Theater in Los Angeles on August 24, 2012. The Nokia Theater stop made the group the first Korean girl group to rank on the Billboard Current Box Core, where they ranked #29 with an almost sold out concert. The New Evolution tour expanded to the rest of Asia later that year, starting with Japan and concluding in Singapore at Singapore Indoor Stadium.

In 2014, 2NE1 embarked on their second worldwide concert tour, the "All or Nothing World Tour", in support of their second studio album, Crush. The tour visited a total of 15 cities in 12 countries across East and Southeast Asia. The tour's began in Seoul, South Korea and concluded in Macao, China.

Concert tours

One-off concerts

Fan meetings

Affiliated tours

YG Family 15th Anniversary Concert (2011–2012)

YG Family World Tour: Power (2014)

Notes

References

Concert tours
Lists of concert tours
Lists of concert tours of South Korean artists
Lists of events in South Korea
South Korean music-related lists
K-pop concerts by artist